The E Street Band is an American rock band, and has been musician Bruce Springsteen's primary backing band since 1972. The band was inducted into the Rock and Roll Hall of Fame in 2014. For the bulk of Springsteen's recording and performing career, the band consisted of: guitarists Steven Van Zandt, Nils Lofgren, and Patti Scialfa, keyboardists Danny Federici and Roy Bittan, bassist Garry Tallent, drummer Max Weinberg, and saxophonist Clarence Clemons.

When not working with Springsteen, members of the band have recorded solo material and have pursued successful careers as session musicians, record producers, songwriters, actors and other roles in entertainment. The most highly visible in their separate careers are drummer Max Weinberg, who has led his own band, first on Late Night with Conan O'Brien and then on the Tonight Show with Conan O'Brien, from 1993 to 2010, and guitarist Steven Van Zandt, who starred as Silvio Dante in the HBO television series The Sopranos, from 1999 to 2007, and as Frank "The Fixer" Tagliano in the 2012–2014 Netflix series Lilyhammer.

The band members have also performed and recorded (both individually and as a band) with a wide range of other artists including Air Supply, Gary U.S. Bonds, David Bowie, Tracy Chapman, Ray Davies, Dire Straits, Bob Dylan, Steve Earle, John Fogerty, Aretha Franklin, Peter Gabriel, The Grateful Dead, Emmylou Harris, Ian Hunter, Lady Gaga, Darlene Love, Paul McCartney, Meat Loaf, Tom Morello, Stevie Nicks, Lou Reed, The Rolling Stones, Santana, Bob Seger, Southside Johnny, Ronnie Spector, Ringo Starr, Sting, Bonnie Tyler, Lucinda Williams, and Neil Young.

History

Members
The E Street Band was founded in October 1972, but it was not formally named until September 1974. Springsteen has put together other backing bands during his career, but the E Street Band has been together more or less continuously since its inception.

The original lineup included Garry Tallent (bass), Clarence Clemons (saxophone), Danny Federici (keyboards, accordion), Vini "Mad Dog" Lopez (drums) and David Sancious (keyboards). The band took its name from the street in Belmar, New Jersey, where Sancious' mother lived. She allowed the band to rehearse in her garage. Tourists to the area seeking sight of early Springsteen haunts often mistakenly believe the house was on the corner of E Street and 10th Avenue, perhaps due to the song "Tenth Avenue Freeze-Out" about the band's beginnings. The Sancious house was at 1107 E Street with the garage squeezed between the house and the southside fence.

Springsteen's debut Greetings from Asbury Park, N.J. was released in January 1973, and the band's first national tour began in October 1972. Sancious, even though he played on the album, missed that first tour. It was not until June 1973 that he began appearing regularly on stage with the band.

In February 1974, Lopez was asked to resign, and was briefly replaced by Ernest "Boom" Carter. A few months later, in August 1974, Sancious and Carter left to form their own jazz fusion band called Tone. They were replaced in September 1974 by Roy Bittan (keyboards) and Max Weinberg (drums). Violinist Suki Lahav was briefly a member of the band before leaving in March 1975 to emigrate to Israel (where she would later find success as a songwriter and novelist). Steven Van Zandt (guitar, vocals), who had long been associated with Springsteen and had played in previous bands with him, officially joined the band in July 1975.

This lineup remained stable until the early 1980s when Van Zandt left to pursue his own career, a move that was announced in 1984. He would later rejoin the band in 1995. In June 1984, Nils Lofgren (guitar, vocals) was added to replace Van Zandt; Springsteen's future wife Patti Scialfa (vocals, later guitar) was also added to the lineup.

By 2002, the band also included Soozie Tyrell (violin, guitar, vocals). Tyrell had earlier worked with Scialfa touring with Southside Johnny and the Asbury Jukes and sporadically with Springsteen dating back to the early 1990s. Whether Tyrell became as full-fledged a member as the others remains unclear. Some press releases refer to her as a "special guest", the cover notes of Live in Barcelona list her as a "with" member, the liner notes of We Shall Overcome: The Seeger Sessions refer to her as "violinist with the E Street Band", and some press releases don't mention her at all. When asked about the lack of mention in a press release prior to the Magic Tour, Springsteen just said in response, "Soozie will be with us."

On November 21, 2007, it was announced that Danny Federici would take a leave of absence from Springsteen and the E Street Band's ongoing Magic Tour to pursue treatment for melanoma, and was temporarily replaced by veteran musician Charles Giordano. Springsteen stated at the time: "Danny is one of the pillars of our sound and has played beside me as a great friend for more than 40 years. We all eagerly await his healthy and speedy return." Federici made his only return to the stage on March 20, 2008, when he appeared for portions of a Springsteen and E Street Band performance at Conseco Fieldhouse in Indianapolis; he died on April 17 that year at the Memorial Sloan-Kettering Cancer Center in New York City, having suffered for three years with melanoma. Springsteen's album Working on a Dream is dedicated to him. Giordano has since become an unofficial member of the band.

Clarence Clemons suffered a stroke on June 12, 2011. While initial signs had been hopeful after his hospitalization and two subsequent brain surgeries, he reportedly took a turn for the worse later in the week and died on June 18. Clemons' nephew Jake has filled his role on the saxophone since 2012.

On occasions (e.g. their Super Bowl XLIII performance) the lineup has been augmented by a horn section, sometimes referred to as The Miami Horns. Its most prominent members include Richie Rosenberg (trombone) and Mark Pender (trumpet).

Origins in Asbury Park 

In the late 1960s and early 1970s, there was a vibrant music scene in and around the City of Asbury Park on the Jersey Shore. Prominent in this scene were Bruce Springsteen and Southside Johnny as well as the early members of the E Street Band. Clemons, Federici, Lopez, Sancious, Tallent and Van Zandt honed their skills in numerous bands, both with and without Springsteen. These included Little Melvin & the Invaders, the Downtown Tangiers Band, the Jaywalkers, Moment of Truth, Glory Road, Child, Steel Mill, Dr. Zoom & the Sonic Boom, the Sundance Blues Band, and the Bruce Springsteen Band. In 1972, when Springsteen gained a recording contract with CBS, he picked the cherries among Jersey Shore musicians to record – and to tour in support of – his debut album, Greetings from Asbury Park, N.J. By 1973, they had recorded a second album with Springsteen, The Wild, the Innocent and the E Street Shuffle.

Album credits
The E Street Band established its reputation among studio musicians in the 1970s and the 1980s with its significant contribution to the Springsteen albums Born to Run, Darkness on the Edge of Town, The River and Born in the U.S.A. However, unlike such backing bands as the Silver Bullet Band or the Heartbreakers, the E Street Band never received a full credit on a Springsteen studio album. Only individual band members were credited. Even though the band did all or nearly all of the playing on these albums, each was released solely under Springsteen's name. Indeed, the E Street Band is not even mentioned as such in any of the literature for these albums until an inside liner note for The River, and then a cover "Performed by" credit on Born in the U.S.A. Later albums such as Tunnel of Love and Greatest Hits did name the band and list the members.

Concerts were a different story. Live performances were almost always billed as Bruce Springsteen & the E Street Band, and Springsteen pointed the spotlight on the brand logo style of the band onstage. In each concert, Springsteen typically would extend one song (between 1974 and 1984, almost always "Rosalita") to involve an elaborate introduction of each member of the band, introducing nicknames, characterizing each player ("Professor" Roy Bittan, "Miami" Steve Van Zandt, "Phantom" Dan Federici, "Mighty" Max Weinberg, and Garry "W." Tallent), whipping the song and the audience into a frenzy for the final, over-the-top introduction of the "Big Man", Clarence Clemons. More substantially, Springsteen split concert revenues equally with the band members, a practice almost unheard of for backing bands in the music industry.

Thus in 1979 when Springsteen and the band featured on the No Nukes album and No Nukes film, the live performance was credited to both. The band received their first full credit on a Springsteen album with the release of Live/1975–85, which was credited to Bruce Springsteen & the E Street Band. All subsequent live recordings and concert DVDs have also been credited to both.

Southside Johnny, Ronnie Spector and Gary U.S. Bonds 
Van Zandt also began to establish himself a reputation as a producer/songwriter. Apart from helping out with production on Springsteen albums, he worked with his "other band", Southside Johnny & the Asbury Jukes, as well as with Ronnie Spector and Gary U.S. Bonds, before he launched his own solo career as Little Steven. The E Street Band and Springsteen regularly helped out on all these projects. In 1977, they recorded a single with Ronnie Spector featuring a cover of the Billy Joel song, "Say Goodbye to Hollywood", and a Van Zandt original, "Baby Please Don't Go". This was the first time the band received a full credit. In 1978, Weinberg became an "honorary Juke" when he recorded Hearts of Stone with Southside Johnny.

In the early 1980s, the E Street Band helped re-launch the career of Gary U.S. Bonds, when it provided backup on two albums, Dedication and On the Line. Van Zandt produced both with Springsteen. Each album featured songs by Springsteen and Van Zandt, and a cover of the Cajun classic "Jole Blon". The moderate success of these albums earned Van Zandt a solo recording contract with EMI. Initially without a band of his own, he simply borrowed Clemons, Federici, Tallent, Weinberg, and an assortment of Jukes, including Rosenberg and Pender, to record his 1982 debut Men Without Women. This was released under the name of Little Steven & the Disciples of Soul.

Courtesy of the E Street Band 

Other artists had also begun to recognize their talents and the band members were never out of work. Producer/songwriter Jim Steinman used Bittan and Weinberg on Meat Loaf's Bat Out of Hell and Dead Ringer; on his own Bad for Good project; Bonnie Tyler's Faster Than the Speed of Night and Secret Dreams and Forbidden Fire albums; and Greatest Hits from Air Supply, on the cut, "Making Love Out of Nothing at All" which featured an extra expansive Wall of Sound effect from Bittan & Weinberg. Also, Tallent, Bittan, and Weinberg, along with Mick Ronson, recorded an album with Ian Hunter titled You're Never Alone with a Schizophrenic. Bittan and Federici also provided keyboards for Garland Jeffreys on his Escape Artist, while the former would make notable contributions to albums by David Bowie, Dire Straits, Bob Seger and Stevie Nicks. Several of these albums acknowledged their contributions with a credit such as "courtesy of the E Street Band".

Throughout the 1980s, members of the band were involved with various other projects. In 1985, Bittan and Van Zandt recorded sessions with Bob Dylan for his Empire Burlesque album. Although not used at the time, the recordings later surfaced on Dylan's The Bootleg Series. In 1985, Van Zandt spearheaded Artists United Against Apartheid. An album and single featured Springsteen and Clemons, among others. Tallent also produced a single with Jersey Artists For Mankind which featured Springsteen, Lofgren, Clemons and Weinberg as well as Carter and Rosenberg. Clemons teamed up with Sancious both on his solo album Hero and on albums with Zucchero Fornaciari. Clemons and Lofgren also went on tour with Ringo Starr and his All-Starr Band in 1989.

Breakup
In 1989, Springsteen informed the E Street Band members that he would not be using their services for the foreseeable future. He had already recorded one completely solo album, Nebraska. The last full band activity had been autumn 1988's Human Rights Now! Tour. Band members started to go their separate ways and onto separate projects – Tallent to Nashville to work on record production, Federici to California, Clemons to Florida, Lofgren to Maryland to resume his long-time solo activities. Weinberg, besides an abortive try at law school, was putting together the band Killer Joe and recording an album. Scene of the Crime included a guest appearance from Little Steven, playing guitar on the Springsteen written instrumental "Summer On Signal Hill". In 1993, Weinberg became the band leader on Late Night with Conan O'Brien and remained such for its entire run. When O'Brien moved to The Tonight Show in 2009, Weinberg reprised his role as bandleader, and the show's house band – formerly called the Max Weinberg 7 – was redubbed Max Weinberg and the Tonight Show Band.

In 1992, the E Street Band and the Miami Horns backed Darlene Love on the single "All Alone on Christmas" written by Little Steven and featured on the soundtrack for Home Alone 2: Lost in New York.

Springsteen made guest appearances on solo albums by both Nils Lofgren and Clarence Clemons and he joined Max Weinberg, Garry Tallent and Little Steven when they reprised their role as "honorary Jukes" on Southside Johnny's Better Days in 1992.

Springsteen also continued to use assorted members of the band on his forthcoming albums and projects. Roy Bittan would be retained for both Human Touch and Lucky Town. The former included a guest appearance from David Sancious while the latter introduced Soozie Tyrell. Patti Scialfa also provided backing vocals on both. Little Steven produced and played guitar on a remix of the single "57 Channels". However, the majority of musicians used on these albums were session musicians. The E Street Band was not used on the subsequent Springsteen tour either, although Bittan was again retained and Scialfa occasionally added backing vocals; both were consequently featured on In Concert/MTV Plugged. The Ghost of Tom Joad saw Danny Federici, Garry Tallent, Tyrell and Scialfa provide backing on some tracks while Federici, Tyrell and Scialfa all turn up sporadically on Devils & Dust.

Although individual members of the band played on Human Touch, Lucky Town, In Concert/MTV Plugged, The Ghost of Tom Joad and Devils & Dust, none of these albums are regarded as E Street Band albums. Tunnel of Love falls into a grey area and its status is open to debate.

Reunion era, Hall of Fame induction, future with Springsteen 
In 1995, Springsteen released Greatest Hits and the E Street Band was temporarily reunited to record four new songs. In 1998, he released Tracks, a box set collection of unreleased recordings dating back to 1972, many of which featured the band.

Finally in 1999, Springsteen and the E Street Band reunited on a more substantial basis, 10 years after he had dismissed them. They staged an extremely successful Reunion Tour, culminating in an HBO special and collection Live in New York City. With the exception of Weinberg and Van Zandt, the members of the band had not been in the public eye. There seemed to be no long-term animosity from the split.

In 2002, the reunion was continued with the release of new studio album The Rising and the long, successful Rising Tour. Another release from this era was The Essential Bruce Springsteen, another greatest hits package combined with more archival material.

The October 2004 Vote for Change tour was the last E Street Band effort for a while. The 2005 Devils & Dust album used scatterings of Federici, Scialfa, and Tyrell, while the 2006 Sessions Band Tour used Scialfa and Tyrell among the largely numbered backing musicians. During the latter, Springsteen mentioned he did plan to work with the E Street Band again in the future, but was vague about details.

Finally, in early 2007, E Street Band members separately traveled to Atlanta to contribute to Springsteen's Magic. Concurrent with the album's release in October 2007, the Magic Tour began. However, after the conclusion of the tour's first leg on November 19, 2007, Danny Federici took a leave of absence from the tour to pursue treatment for melanoma; he was replaced by Sessions Band member Charles Giordano. Federici made his only return to the stage on March 20, 2008, when he appeared for portions of a Springsteen and E Street Band performance in Indianapolis. He died on April 17, 2008.

Springsteen had always given elaborate band introductions during shows, often incorporating humorous characterizations of band members or stories of how they had joined and always building up to an over-the-top introduction of "Master of the Universe" stage foil Clarence Clemons. Springsteen used the ending of the Reunion Tour's band intro song, "Tenth Avenue Freeze-Out", to introduce a more specially branded sequence to emphasize his view of the E Street Band's greatness. This practice continued on "Mary's Place" on The Rising Tour and at the end of the Magic Tour shows with "American Land". The exact wording varied, but generally was some form of the following: 
[city]!
[city]!
You've just seen...the heart-stopping, pants-dropping, house-rocking, earth-quaking, booty-shaking, Viagra-taking, love-making –
Le-gen-dary E – Street – Band!
On the Magic Tour, the video screens around the stage added cartoon-like graphics to illustrate the final E! Street! Band! exclamation.

In the wake of the passing of Federici and then Clemons, Springsteen amended the introduction to "testifying, death-defying, legendary E Street Band!"

Bruce Springsteen and the E Street Band were the stars of the Super Bowl XLIII Halftime Show in Tampa, Florida on February 1, 2009. Springsteen's "heart-stopping ..." rap was included in the promotional material aired on NBC in the two months leading up to the performance. The sequence then got its biggest audience immediately prior to Springsteen and the band taking the stage at halftime, when a prerecorded series of football players from the game saying each phrase in turn was aired by way of introducing the performance.

Prior to the game, on Thursday, January 29, Springsteen gave a rare press conference, where he promised a "twelve minute party". When asked if he would be nervous performing before such a large audience, Springsteen alluded to his recent January 18, 2009 appearance at the "We Are One" concert at the Lincoln Memorial, a celebration of Barack Obama's Presidential inauguration: "You'll have a lot of crazy football fans, but you won't have Lincoln staring over your shoulder. That takes some of the pressure off." The Super Bowl performance coincided with the release of a new album titled Working on a Dream, released on January 27, 2009. The band's set, which ran a little over the allotted 12 minutes, included the songs "Tenth Avenue Freeze-Out", "Born to Run", "Working on a Dream", and "Glory Days". The Miami Horns and a large choir, the Joyce Garrett Singers, joined the band onstage.

Nineteen-year-old Jay Weinberg filled in at drums for his father, Max, during portions of shows, or for some full shows, during the 2009 Working on a Dream Tour. This was due to the elder Weinberg's obligations for the debuting The Tonight Show with Conan O'Brien.

On June 12, 2011, Clarence Clemons suffered a stroke and died six days later from resulting complications, on June 18 at age 69. Steve Van Zandt wrote on his web site "We will continue to make music and perform. Let's face it, that's all we really know how to do. But it will be very different without him." On February 11, 2012, Springsteen announced that Jake Clemons, the nephew of Clarence Clemons, would tour with the E Street Band as the group's new saxophonist, splitting time with Eddie Manion. Augmented by a full horn section, an additional percussionist Everett Bradley, and an additional singer and rapper in Michelle Moore, the E Street Band that undertook the 2012–2013 Wrecking Ball Tour was the largest yet. Guitarist Tom Morello, best known for his work with Rage Against the Machine, filled in for Van Zandt on some of the dates.

On December 17, 2013, the Rock and Roll Hall of Fame announced that the E Street Band would be inducted in 2014 under The Award for Musical Excellence induction category. The band was inducted by Springsteen on April 10, 2014. Bittan, Clemons, Federici, Lofgren, Lopez, Scialfa, Sancious, Tallent, Weinberg, and Van Zandt were all inducted and each given time to speak, with the family/widows of Federici and Clemons representing their husbands. Following the induction, Springsteen and the E Street Band – with Lopez, Sancious and The E Street Horns – performed "The E Street Shuffle", "The River" and "Kitty's Back". "They should have figured it out before the band started passing away," grumbled Lofgren. "Clarence and especially Danny both took our exclusion hard, and neither is with us any more. So it was a bittersweet night."

The High Hopes Tour kicked off in January 2014 and concluded in May 2014. The band was again joined by the horn section and by Tom Morello for the entire tour. Van Zandt missed most of the North American leg due to filming his television series, Lilyhammer. The tour supported Springsteen's 2014 album, High Hopes. Jake Clemons' role in the band had been expanded and his interactions on stage with Springsteen were like those of his uncle. In 2015, Springsteen announced plans for The River Tour 2016. He had originally planned a solo tour, but felt that it would delay his next tour with the E Street Band for a few years. Envisaged as a short tour, it expanded to an eight-month outing from January to September 2016. The tour did not include Morello or the horn section, with the exception of Clemons. The band's second show in Philadelphia on September 9, 2016, was amongst the longest shows of Springsteen's career, clocking in at 4 hours and 4 minutes, two minutes shy of his longest show ever in 2012. An 11-date tour of Australia and New Zealand called Summer '17 took place in January and February 2017.

Springsteen followed up the Summer '17 tour by announcing a solo concert residency on Broadway without the E Street Band. Springsteen on Broadway ran from October 3, 2017, to December 15, 2018. On January 18, 2018, Lofgren was asked on Twitter if the E Street Band will ever tour with Springsteen again. Lofgren responded saying "I sure hope so" however Tallent responded saying that it was "looking unlikely though", fueling rumors of the end of the E Street Band. The following day, Tallent responded to his original comment saying "just to be clear, I know as much as you. I like Nils' answer better". On February 2, 2018, Weinberg commented on the future of the E Street Band performing with Springsteen saying "Don't worry, we ain’t done yet. The E Street Band will be back out on the road."

On December 2, 2018, Springsteen announced that new music was on the way but the E Street Band would not be touring in 2019. He is taking a break after his Broadway run and various recording projects. In April 2019 it was announced that Springsteen's next album, Western Stars, would be a solo release without the E Street Band. In a May 5, 2019 interview with Martin Scorsese, Springsteen revealed that he has written almost an album's worth of material for a new album with the E Street Band and that there will be a tour. Springsteen said that writer's block caused problems for him in coming up with new music for the E Street Band and even made him doubt if he could create new music. "I couldn't write anything for the band. And I said, ‘Well, of course ... you'll never be able to do that again!’ And it's a trick every time you do it, you know? And then about a month or so ago, I wrote almost an album's worth of material for the band. And it came out of just... I mean, I know where it came from, but at the same time, it just came out of almost nowhere. You go, ‘Fuck, I'm not fucked, all right? There'll be another tour!"

On May 25, 2019, Springsteen was quoted by Italian newspaper la Repubblica saying an E Street Band tour and new album will happen in 2020. "We will go on tour next year. I will go into the studio to record with the E Street Band, starting in the fall, and when we finish we will go on tour" Springsteen said. Despite Springsteen's comments in late 2019 on a new album and tour, on February 12, 2020, Van Zandt cast some doubt over a 2020 tour saying "Let's just say I thought I was going to be busier than I am. So at the moment, 2020 seems to have opened up." Weinberg also said he planned on touring with his own band from April through December 2020. On September 10, 2020, Springsteen announced his twentieth studio album, Letter to You which will be released on October 23, 2020. The album marks the first release featuring the E Street Band since 2014's High Hopes.

In a September 20, 2020 interview with Rolling Stone, Springsteen said that he didn't expect to tour again until at least 2022 saying "My antenna tells me, at best, 2022. And I would consider the concert industry lucky if it happens then. I'm going to consider myself lucky if I lose just a year of touring life. Once you hit 70, there's a finite amount of tours and a finite amount of years that you have. And so you lose one or two, that's not so great. Particularly because I feel the band is capable of playing at the very, very, very top, or better than, of its game right now. And I feel as vital as I’ve ever felt in my life.... It's not being able to do something that is a fundamental life force, something I’ve lived for since I was 16 years old."

Bruce Springsteen and the E Street Band performed as the musical guest on the December 12, 2020 episode of Saturday Night Live marking their first performance since 2017 and their first to promote Letter to You. "Ghosts" and "I'll See You in My Dreams" were performed. Garry Tallent and Soozie Tyrell opted to not travel and perform due to COVID-19 restrictions. Jack Daley of the Disciples of Soul filled in for Tallent.

On May 13, 2021, during a four-song acoustic set following his acceptance of the Woody Guthrie Prize, Springsteen announced that a new album was coming out soon saying "California was an enormous influence on some of my most topical writing through my ‘90s, 2000s and even now. We have a record coming out soon that's set largely in the West." It is unknown if this album will feature the E Street Band or if it will be a solo album.

In June 2021, Springsteen announced that he was talked into resuming his Springsteen on Broadway performances by a "friend" in the summer of 2021 however confirmed there would be an E Street Band tour in 2022 saying "It gives me something to do this summer so I won't be lazying around on the beach. I knew we were going to tour with the band next year so I said I'll take some time off." Springsteen also discussed future music releases saying "We have something coming out in the fall. I'm not sure if it's been announced yet. I got projects I've been working on basically that are slated for release either next year or in the fall. Not new records, but things I think the fans are going to be interested in."

On December 14, 2021, Max Weinberg indicated that he felt a tour with Springsteen and the E Street Band was very likely in 2022 saying "Until the bus pulls up at my house, figuratively speaking, I'm not quite sure but I'm pretty convinced ... (that) myself, my colleagues and the people who are interested are going to be very pleasantly surprised in 2022. I don't make plans for Bruce Springsteen and the E Street Band but I feel very good about the next 18, 24 months." In May 2022, a US and European tour was announced for 2023.

Tours
Born to Run tours, 1974–1977
Darkness Tour, 1978–1979
The River Tour, 1980–1981
Born in the U.S.A. Tour, 1984–1985
Tunnel of Love Express Tour, 1988
Amnesty International Human Rights Now! Tour, 1988
Reunion Tour, 1999–2000
The Rising Tour, 2002–2003
Vote for Change Tour, 2004
Magic Tour, 2007–2008
Working On a Dream Tour, 2009
Wrecking Ball Tour, 2012–2013
High Hopes Tour, 2014
The River Tour 2016, 2016
Summer '17, 2017
2023 Tour, 2023

Band members

Current official members 
 Bruce Springsteen – lead vocals, guitar, harmonica, keyboards (1972–1989, 1995, 1999–present)
 Gary Tallent – bass, backing vocals (1972–1989, 1995, 1999–present)
 Roy Bittan – piano, accordion, keyboards (1974–1989, 1995, 1999–present)
 Max Weinberg – drums, percussion (1974–1989, 1995, 1999–present)
 Steven Van Zandt – rhythm and lead guitar, mandolin, backing vocals (1975–1984, 1995, 1999–present)
 Nils Lofgren – lead and rhythm guitar, accordion, backing vocals (1984–1989, 1995, 1999–present)
 Patti Scialfa – backing vocals, rhythm guitar (1984–1989, 1995, 1999–present)

Current touring members 
Soozie Tyrell – violin, backing vocals, percussion, acoustic guitar (2002–present)
Charles Giordano – organ, accordion, synthesizer (2008–present)
Jake Clemons – saxophones, percussion, backing vocals (2012–present)

Timeline 

Touring musicians

Discography

Albums and singles featuring the E Street Band
 Bruce Springsteen & The E Street Band
 Live/1975–85 (1986)
 Live in New York City (2001)
 Hammersmith Odeon London '75 (2006)
 Magic Tour Highlights (2008)
 Bruce Springsteen & The E Street Band Greatest Hits (2009)
 Live from the Carousel (2011)
 Apollo Theater 3/09/12 (2014)
 The Agora, Cleveland 1978 (2015)
 Tower Theater, Philadelphia 1975 (2015)
 Nassau Coliseum, New York 1980 (2015)
 Brendan Byrne Arena, New Jersey 1984 (2015)
 LA Sports Arena, California 1988 (2015)
 Ippodromo delle Capannelle, Rome 2013 (2015)
 Arizona State University, Tempe 1980 (2015)
 HSBC Arena, Buffalo, NY, 11/22/09 (2016)
 Scottrade Center, St. Louis, MO, 8/23/08 (2017)
 Olympiastadion, Helsinki, July 31, 2012 (2017)
 Wachovia Spectrum, Philadelphia, PA 10/20/09 (2017)
 Palace Theater, Albany, NY 2/7/1977 (2017)
 Auditorium Theatre, Rochester, NY 2/8/1977 (2017)
 The Summit, Houston, TX 12/8/1978 (2017)
 The Live Series: Songs of the Road (2018)
 The Live Series: Songs of Friendship (2019)
 The Live Series: Songs of Hope (2019)
 Bruce Springsteen
 Greetings from Asbury Park, N.J. (1973)
 The Wild, the Innocent & the E Street Shuffle (1973)
 Born to Run (1975)
 Darkness on the Edge of Town (1978)
 The River (1980)
 Electric Nebraska (Slated for 1982 but cancelled)
 Born in the U.S.A. (1984)
 The Born in the U.S.A. 12" Single Collection (1985)
 Tunnel of Love (1987)
 Chimes of Freedom (1988)
 Greatest Hits (1995)
 Blood Brothers (1996)
 Tracks (1998)
 18 Tracks (1999)
 The Rising (2002)
 The Essential Bruce Springsteen (2003)
 Born to Run: 30th Anniversary Edition (2005)
 Magic (2007)
 Working on a Dream (2009)
 The Collection 1973–1984 (2010)
 The Promise (2010)
 The Promise: The Darkness on the Edge of Town Story (2010)
 Wrecking Ball (2012)
 Collection: 1973–2012 (2013)
 The Album Collection Vol. 1 1973–1984 (2014)
 High Hopes (2014)
 American Beauty (2014)
 The Ties That Bind: The River Collection (2015)
 Chapter and Verse (2016)
 Letter to You (2020)
Ronnie Spector & the E Street Band
"Say Goodbye to Hollywood" / "Baby Please Don't Go" (1977)
Gary U.S. Bonds
  Dedication (1981)
  On the Line (1982)
Other albums/singles
Musicians United for Safe Energy: No Nukes (1979)
Various artists: In Harmony 2 (1981)
USA for Africa: We Are the World (1985)
Various artists: A Very Special Christmas (1987)
Various artists: Folkways - A Vision Shared (1988)
Darlene Love: "All Alone On Christmas" (1992)
Various artists: The Concert for the Rock & Roll Hall of Fame (1996)
Various artists: Enjoy Every Sandwich: The Songs of Warren Zevon (2004)

Albums and singles featuring two or more individual band members only
Bruce Springsteen – Part 2
These albums are notable for not using the E Street Band; however, a few members of the band appeared on each of them, including singer Patti Scialfa who appeared on all of them.
Human Touch (1992) (Bittan, Scialfa, former-member Sancious)
Lucky Town (1992) (Bittan, Scialfa, member-to-be Tyrell)
In Concert/MTV Plugged (1992) (Bittan, Scialfa)
The Ghost of Tom Joad (1995) (Federici, Tallent, Scialfa, member-to-be Tyrell)
Devils & Dust (2005) (Federici, Scialfa, and Tyrell)
We Shall Overcome: The Seeger Sessions (2006) (Scialfa, Tyrell, member-to-be Giordano)
 Wrecking Ball (2012) (Clemons, Scialfa, Van Zandt, Weinberg, and Tyrell and Giordano)
Little Steven
Men Without Women (1982) (Van Zandt, Clemons, Federici, Tallent, Springsteen, Weinberg, Manion)
Freedom - No Compromise (1987) (Van Zandt, Springsteen)
Soulfire (2017) (Van Zandt, Manion, Mizelle, Springsteen)
Soulfire Live! (2018) (Van Zandt, Bradley, Manion, Springsteen)
Meat Loaf
Bat Out of Hell (1977) (Bittan and Weinberg)
Dead Ringer (1981) (Bittan and Weinberg)
Southside Johnny and The Asbury Jukes
This Time It's for Real (1977) (Manion, Van Zandt, Springsteen, Carter)
Hearts of Stone (1978) (Weinberg, Van Zandt, Miami Horns, Springsteen)
Reach Up and Touch the Sky (1981) (Springsteen, Van Zandt, Manion, Scialfa)
Better Days (1991) (Van Zandt, Manion, Springsteen, Tallent, Weinberg)
Bonnie Tyler
Faster Than the Speed of Night (1983) (Bittan and Weinberg)
Secret Dreams and Forbidden Fire (1986) (Bittan, Weinberg, King, Mizelle)
Patti Scialfa
Rumble Doll (1993) (Scialfa, Lofgren, Springsteen, Tyrell)
23rd Street Lullaby (2004) (Scialfa, Lofgren, Springsteen, Tyrell, Moore)
Play It as It Lays (2007) (Scialfa, King, Lofgren, Mizelle, Moore, Springsteen, Tyrell)
Clarence Clemons
Rescue (1983) (Clemons, Springsteen)
Hero (1985) (Clemons, Sancious)
Live in Asbury Park, Vol. 2 (2004) (Clemons, Springsteen)
Other artists
Ian Hunter: You're Never Alone with a Schizophrenic (1979) (Bittan, Weinberg, Tallent)
Garland Jeffreys: Escape Artist (1980) (Bittan, Federici)
Jim Steinman: Bad for Good (1981) (Bittan, Weinberg)
Artists United Against Apartheid: Sun City (1985) (Van Zandt, Springsteen, Clemons)
John Eddie: John Eddie (1986) (Lofgren, Weinberg)
Jersey Artists For Mankind: "We Got the Love" / "Save Love, Save Life" (1986) (Weinberg, Springsteen, Clemons, Tallent, Manion, Carter)
Ringo Starr: Ringo Starr and His All-Starr Band (1990) (Lofgren, Clemons)
Nils Lofgren: Silver Lining (1990) (Lofgren, Clemons, Springsteen)
Killer Joe: Scene of the Crime (1991) (Van Zandt, Springsteen, Weinberg)
Bob Dylan: The Bootleg Series Volumes 1–3 (Rare & Unreleased) 1961–1991 (1991) (Bittan, Van Zandt)
Soozie Tyrell: White Lines (2003) (Tyrell, Springsteen, Scialfa)
Darlene Love: Introducing Darlene Love (2015) (Jake Clemons, Springsteen, Van Zandt, Manion, Ramm)

References

External links

Musical groups established in 1972
Rock music groups from New Jersey
Jersey Shore musical groups
Bruce Springsteen
Musical backing groups
1972 establishments in New Jersey
New Jersey Hall of Fame inductees